Vexillum chinoi is a species of small sea snail, marine gastropod mollusk in the family Costellariidae, the ribbed miters.

Description
The length of the shell attains 28 mm.

Distribution
This marine species occurs off the Philippines.

References

 Poppe G.T. (2008) New Fissurellidae, Epitoniidae, Aclididae, Mitridae and Costellariidae from the Philippines. Visaya 2(3): 37-63

chinoi
Gastropods described in 2008